Cerner Corporation is an American supplier of health information technology (HIT) services, devices, and hardware. As of February 2018, its products were in use at more than 27,000 facilities around the world. The company had more than 29,000 employees globally, with over 13,000 in Kansas City, Missouri. Its headquarters are in the suburb of North Kansas City, Missouri.

In December 2021, Oracle Corporation announced an agreement to buy Cerner for approximately $28.3 billion. The deal closed in June 2022.

History
Cerner was founded in 1979 by Neal Patterson, Paul Gorup, and Cliff Illig, who were colleagues at Arthur Andersen. Its original name was PGI & Associates but was renamed Cerner in 1984 when it rolled out its first system, PathNet. It went public in 1986. Cerner's client base grew steadily in the late 1980s, reaching 70 sites in 1987, 120 sites in 1988, 170 sites in 1989, and reaching 250 sites in 1990. Installations were primarily of PathNet systems.

During this time, Cerner was developing components of a Health Network Architecture (HNA), an integrated IT system designed to automate health care processes. Clients could purchase individual components or the whole system at one time. By 1994, more than 30 clients had purchased the full HNA system, while 100 clients had purchased multiple components of the system.

In 1997, the company introduced Cerner Millennium, an upgrade to its HNA system which incorporated all of the company's software offerings into one unified architecture. The introduction of Millennium contributed to significant growth for the company, with revenue increasing to $1.1 billion in 2005 from $245.1 million in 1997.

Cerner acquired IMC Health Care, Inc. in early 2010 to continue expanding its wellness services to outside commercial employers, pharmacies, and wellness programs.

In July 2010, president Trace Devanny left the company and Patterson became the company's president, in addition to his roles as chairman and chief executive officer.  In September 2013, Zane Burke was named president, assuming the title from Patterson.

On August 5, 2014, Cerner announced its intent to purchase Siemens Health Services, the health information technology business of Germany's Siemens AG, for $1.3 billion. The acquisition was completed on February 2, 2015.

On July 29, 2015, Leidos Partnership for Defense Health, which includes Cerner, Accenture, and Leidos, was awarded a 10-year, $4.3 billion contract to overhaul and manage the electronic health records for the Department of Defense.

CEO and co-founder Neal Patterson died July 9, 2017.

On January 10, 2018, Brent Shafer was named Chairman and CEO and took over leadership responsibilities in February 2018.

In July 2019, Cerner announced that it would partner with Amazon Web Services.

On September 4, 2019, Cerner laid off 255 employees as part of an ongoing cost-cutting effort and reorganization.

In February 2020, Cerner sold parts of its healthcare IT business in Germany and Spain to German company CompuGroup Medical SE for EUR 225 million (USD 247.5M).

In 2020, Cerner announced the hire of three new C-suite executives including Jerome Labat as chief technology officer (CTO), Darrell Johnson as chief marketing officer (CMO) and William Mintz as chief strategy officer (CSO).

On August 19, 2021, Cerner announced that Dr. David Feinberg, vice-president and head of Google Health, will become President and CEO of Cerner, effective October 1, 2021.

On December 20, 2021, Oracle Corporation announced an agreement to buy Cerner for approximately $28.3 billion. The deal closed in June 2022.

Products 
The company's products include:

 Millennium+, a cloud hosted EHR (Electronic Health Record).
 Cerner FirstNet, emergency department system
 Cerner RadNet Radiology Information System (RIS) 
 Cerner Learning Framework

The Cerner CCL (Cerner Command Language), is a SQL-like programming language developed by Cerner.

Controversy
In 2001, a memo authored by CEO Patterson and sent to about 400 managers was leaked online.  The memo, written in harsh language, was meant to motivate the managers to get more productivity out of employees and promised layoffs, a hiring freeze, closing of an "Associate Center," and the implementation of a punch-card system if Patterson did not see evidence of changes.  Patterson's metric was the fullness of the company's Kansas City office lot at the hours of 8 a.m. and 5 p.m.  The memo was widely seen as inflammatory and poor management, and Cerner's stock price fell 22% over three days.

In 2005, Cerner and other companies paid for a report by the RAND Corporation which predicted great efficiencies from electronic health records, including savings of $81 billion a year or more, which RAND now says is overstated. This report helped drive growth in the electronic health record and billions of dollars in federal incentives to hospitals and doctors. Cerner's revenue tripled from $1 billion in 2005 to a projected $3 billion in 2013. The study was criticized by the Congressional Budget Office for overstating potential savings. A 2013 reassessment of the 2005 report by the RAND Corporation said that the conversion had failed to produce savings and had mixed results in efficiency and patient care.

Canada
In 2016, the emergency department of Nanaimo Regional General Hospital in Nanaimo, British Columbia began using the system. The implementation, which cost $230 million, was met with widespread criticism, with staff calling it a "huge failure" due to an increase in software errors resulting in reduced efficiency of the department. An investigation by British Columbia's Health Ministry indicated that the project was not correctly planned or implemented and that organizational dysfunction at the facility contributed to the failure.

United Kingdom
In 2014, a coroner ruled that a three-year-old heart patient died as a result of a delay to his treatment at Bristol Royal Hospital for Children. The coroner ruled that the hospital's outpatient booking system was responsible for the child not being seen or receiving treatment. The Royal United Hospital had recently installed the Cerner Millennium system. However appointments for the hospital's legacy booking system were not migrated to the new system.

United States
In 2002, the installation of a computerized health system by Cerner in the UPMC Children's Hospital of Pittsburgh  made it harder for the doctors and nurses to do their jobs in emergency situations and resulted in a "disaster," according to Phillip Longman, a senior fellow at the New America Foundation. Longman wrote, "According to a study conducted by the hospital and published in the journal Pediatrics, mortality rates for one vulnerable patient population—those brought by emergency transport from other facilities—more than doubled, from 2.8 percent before the installation to almost 6.6 percent afterward." Defenders of Cerner in the study charged that the Pittsburgh hospital did not adequately prepare for the transition to the Computerized Provider Order Entry (CPOE) system because it had simultaneously modified its pharmacy process, did not provide adequate wireless bandwidth, and did not have order sets pre-programmed on day one. They stated that other hospitals that more carefully planned the implementation did not experience the same problems.

In 2010, Girard Medical Center, Crawford County, Kansas, hired Cerner to install an electronic records system. But after receiving $1.3 million, Cerner employees failed to get the system running in time to qualify for federal incentive payments, and in September 2011, notified the hospital that it was abandoning the project, according to a lawsuit Girard filed against Cerner. Cerner and executives at Girard agreed that Girard did not have adequate staff to manage the acquisition and implementation of the system.  As of June 2014, the case remained in arbitration. The outcome of the Girard case will likely be kept confidential due to contract provisions.

In 2012, Trinity Health, a large hospital in North Dakota, sued Cerner, claiming that Cerner's patient accounting software didn't work correctly; the parties settled for $106M in 2014.

In 2014, a grand jury in California found that Cerner knew that the Ventura County healthcare agency was unprepared to complete a $32 million installation. Also in 2014, a $31 million Cerner implementation at the Athens Regional Health System in Georgia had many problems, leading to forced resignations by the CEO and the CIO of ARHS.

Sweden
Concern has been expressed that the US CLOUD Act could enable US authorities to request data managed by US companies. It has been reported in Sweden that patient data managed by Cerner might be disclosed based on this requirement. Based on this concern, the Vastra Gotland and Skana region health care systems have decided to store any patient data managed by Cerner in Swedish data centers.

In 2022, the regional director of the Vastra Gotaland health care system in Sweden sent a letter to Cerner claiming a breach of contract for deployment of the Millenium system.  The letter stated that there were numerous issues with the system that Cerner had declined to address. At the same time, a deployment of Millenium in region Skane has been delayed but is moving forward.

Locations
Cerner's world headquarters campus is at 2800 Rockcreek Parkway, North Kansas City, Missouri. It acquired additional space in Kansas City, Missouri in 2005 and in 2006 it acquired another location in Kansas City.  In 2013, Cerner announced plans to redevelop 236 acres in south Kansas City, Missouri into an office park. The site was previously occupied by Bannister Mall, which was demolished in 2009. Cerner broke ground on the new campus on November 11, 2014. The $4.45 billion project intends to employ 16,000 new Cerner workers within the decade.

Cerner has offices in about 25 countries worldwide.

References

External links

Software companies established in 1979
Health care companies based in Missouri
Companies based in the Kansas City metropolitan area
Electronic health record software companies
Software companies based in Missouri
Companies formerly listed on the Nasdaq
1979 establishments in Missouri
Health care companies established in 1979
1980s initial public offerings
Software companies of the United States
American companies established in 1979
2022 mergers and acquisitions
Oracle acquisitions
American corporate subsidiaries